Francisco González (born November 19, 1955) played professional tennis in the 1970s and 1980s. He represented Paraguay in Davis Cup and played collegiate tennis at the Ohio State University.

González was ranked as high as world no. 34 in singles, achieved in July 1978, and no. 22 in doubles in November 1984. The biggest singles final of his career was at Cincinnati in 1980, defeating Jimmy Connors in the semifinals before falling to Harold Solomon.

Career highlights

Francisco González has been the head tennis professional at Sierra Sport & Racquet Club since 1998. He had career wins over Ivan Lendl, Jimmy Connors, Stefan Edberg, Andrés Gómez, Vitas Gerulaitis, Yannick Noah, Eliot Teltscher, Johan Kriek, and Henri Leconte. In 1978 he won the mens singles title at the Southern Championships in Greenville, South Carolina.

Career finals

Singles: 2 (2 runner-ups)

Doubles: 20 (10 titles, 10 runner-ups)

References

External links
 
 
 

Living people
1955 births
Paraguayan male tennis players
Sportspeople from Wiesbaden
Ohio State Buckeyes men's tennis players
Tennis players at the 1975 Pan American Games
Pan American Games competitors for Paraguay